Vyacheslav Georgiyevich Litvinov (born 1 April 2001) is a Russian football player. He plays as a centre back for FC Krasnodar.

Club career
He made his debut in the Russian Football National League for FC Krasnodar-2 on 10 March 2020 in a game against FC Chertanovo Moscow. He started the match and played a full game. He made his Russian Premier League debut for FC Krasnodar on 31 October 2020 in a game against FC Akhmat Grozny, as a starter.

Career statistics

References

External links
 Profile by Russian Football National League
 
 
 
 Profile by Russian Football Union

2001 births
People from Anapa
Sportspeople from Krasnodar Krai
Living people
Russian footballers
Russia youth international footballers
Association football defenders
FC Krasnodar-2 players
FC Krasnodar players
Russian Premier League players
Russian First League players
Russian Second League players